Isao Matsushita is the president of JX Holdings, a Japanese petroleum and metals conglomerate, and a Fortune Global 500 company.

Matsushita has been president of JX since June 2012.

References

Living people
Year of birth missing (living people)
Japanese business executives
Place of birth missing (living people)
21st-century Japanese businesspeople